Ethel Hurlbatt (1 July 1866 Bickley, Kent – 22 March 1934 Tours, France) was Principal of Bedford College, University of London, and later Warden of Royal Victoria College, the women's college of McGill University, in Montreal, Quebec, Canada, which had opened in 1899.

Education
She was educated privately and then read modern history at Somerville College, Oxford, from 1888–1892 gaining a second. Her BA and MA were conferred by Trinity College, Dublin in 1905 as Oxford allowed women to sit the examinations but did not confer degrees on women at that time. She did however receive an honorary MA from Oxford in 1925.

Career
After an extra year at Oxford doing work in the Bodleian Library, in 1892 she became principal of Aberdare Hall, a women student's only hall at Cardiff University College, now Cardiff University. In 1898 she became principal of Bedford College but resigned in 1906 due to ill health. From 1907 till retirement in 1929 she was Warden of Royal Victoria College. Her service to the college was recognized in 1930 when she received an honorary LLD from McGill.

During retirement she travelled widely pursuing her interest in sketching. In the year before she died she had several heart attacks, complicated by influenza. She was recognised for her pioneering work in women's education combined with loyalty to the institutions she worked for. She was unmarried.

References

Publications
 Women and McGill Ethel Hurlbatt (1920)

External links
 Profile, McGill.ca; accessed 25 April 2016.

1866 births
1934 deaths
Alumni of Somerville College, Oxford
Academic staff of McGill University
People associated with Bedford College, London